April Greiman (born March 22, 1948) is an American designer widely recognized as one of the first designers to embrace computer technology as a design tool. Greiman is also credited, along with early collaborator Jayme Odgers, with helping to import the European New Wave design style to the US during the late 70s and early 80s." According to design historian Steven Heller, “April Greiman was a bridge between the modern and postmodern, the analog and the digital.” “She is a pivotal proponent of the ‘new typography’ and new wave that defined late twentieth-century graphic design.” Her art combines her Swiss design training with West Coast postmodernism.

Greiman finds the title graphic designer too limiting and prefers to call herself a "transmedia artist". Her work has inspired designers to develop the computer as a tool of design and to be curious and searching in their design approach. Her style includes typelayering, where groups of letterforms are sandwiched and layered, but also made to float in space along with other 'objects in space' such as shapes, photos, illustrations and color swatches. She creates a sense of depth and dynamic, in particular by combining graphic elements through making extensive use of Apple Macintosh technology. Los Angeles Times called her graphic style "an experiment in creating 'hybrid imagery'".

Early life and education 
Born on March 22, 1948, April Greiman grew up in New York City. Her father was an early computer programmer, systems analyst, and founder and president of The Ventura Institute of Technology. Her only sibling, Paul, became a meteorologist and specialist in climatic and atmospheric interplanetary modeling.

Greiman first studied graphic design as an undergraduate at the Kansas City Art Institute, from 1966–1970. She then went on to study at the Allgemeine Kunstgewerbeschule Basel, now known as the Basel School of Design (Schule für Gestaltung Basel) in Basel, Switzerland (1970–1971). She was also a student of Armin Hofmann and Wolfgang Weingart, and she was influenced by the International Style and by Weingarts' introduction to the style later known as New Wave, an aesthetic that moved away from a Modernist heritage.

Career
After completing her studies at the Kansas City Art Institute, Greiman worked as a freelance designer and worked directly with the curator of design at the Museum of Modern Art in New York City. Greiman moved to Los Angeles in 1976 where she established the multi-disciplinary approach where she "...blends technology, science, word and image with color and space...". She directed her first design studio April Greiman, Inc. from 1978–2004. During the 1970s, she rejected the belief among many contemporary designers that computers and digitalization would compromise the International Typographic Style; instead, she exploited pixelation and other digitization "errors" as integral parts of digital art, a position she has held throughout her career.

Upon her relocation from New York City to Los Angeles, she met photographer-artist Jayme Odgers, who became a significant influence on Greiman. Together, they designed a famous Cal Arts poster in 1977 that became an icon of the California New Wave. In 1982, Greiman became head of the design department at the California Institute of the Arts, also known as Cal Arts. In 1984, she lobbied successfully to change the department name to Visual Communications, as she felt the term “graphic design” would prove too limiting to future designers. In that year, she also became a student herself and investigated in greater depth the effects of technology on her own work.

She then returned to full-time practice and acquired her first Macintosh computer. She would later take the Grand Prize in MacWorld'''s First Macintosh Masters in Art Competition. April also contributed to the design of the 1984 Los Angeles Olympics, by creating a memorable poster of running legs silhouetted against a square of bright blue sky in collaboration with Jayme Odgers. An early adopter of this computer as noted in Apple's Mac @ 30 video, Greiman produced an issue of Design Quarterly in 1986, notable in its development of graphic design. Entitled Does it make sense?, the edition was edited by Mildred Friedman and published by the MIT Press / Walker Art Center. "She re-imagined the magazine as a fold-out artwork to almost three-by-six feet. The poster must be carefully unfolded three times across, nine times down. It contained a life-size, MacVision-generated image of her outstretched naked body adorned with symbolic images and text— a provocative gesture, which emphatically countered the objective, rational and masculine tendencies of modernist design." Greiman has said about the poster's unusual format and title “Hopefully, someone will make some sense out of this… The sense it has for me is that it’s new and yet old,… it’s a magazine, which is a poster, which is an object, which is… crazy.”  The poster was also launched as a complement to the Walker Art Center's new Everyday Art Gallery.In 1995, the US Postal Service launched a stamp designed by Greiman to commemorate the Nineteenth Amendment to the United States Constitution (Women's Voting Rights).

In 1997, Greiman and her husband, architect Michael Rotondi, purchased a 1940's motel near Palm Springs, Miracle Manor, and turned it into a showcase for her three-dimensional design of space in natural landscapes.

In 2000, Greiman became a partner at the Los Angeles office of the design firm Pentagram, leaving after a few years in the role. In 2005, she began her current Los Angeles-based design consultancy Made In Space. Teaching 
In 1982, Greiman became the Director of the Visual Communications Program of the California Institute of the Arts’ design department. In 1992, she was adjunct faculty at the Southern California Institute of Architecture until 2009 when she moved on to the Woodbury University School of Architecture until 2018. In January 2019, Greiman became a tenured professor of design at the University of Southern California Roski School of Art and Design.

With four honorary doctorates, April Greiman is seen as one of the "ultimate risktakers" for her unorthodox and progressive approach to design by embracing new technologies.

 Honors and awards 
 Vesta Award for Outstanding Achievements of Women, Hearth and Home Magazine, Los Angeles, California, 1985
 Alliance Graphique Internationale (AGI), Invited Board Member, 1986
 Grand Prize Winner, Macintosh Masters in Art Competition, Macworld, San Francisco, California, 1988 Winner, Unesco International Poster Contest, 1987
 Winner, The Modern Poster Competition, Museum of Modern Art (MoMA), New York City, New York, 1988
 Hall Chair Fellowship, Hallmark Corporation, Kansas City, Missouri, 1990
 Frankfurt Book Fair Bronze Medal for From the Edge: Southern California Institute of Architecture,Der Stiftung Buchkunst Prâmiert (Best Books of the World), Los Angeles, California, 1994
 50 Best Books of the Year, AIGA, New York City, New York, 1997
 AIGA, Gold Medalist, New York City, New York, 1998
 Chrysler Award for Design Innovation, Auburn Hill, Michigan, 1998
 Finalist, Inaugural National Design Award in Communication Arts, Awarded at White House, Clinton Administration, Washington, DC, 2000
 Kansas City Art Institute, Honorary Doctorate, Kansas City, Missouri, 2001
 College of Art and Design, Lesley University, Honorary Doctorate, Cambridge, Massachusetts, 2002
 Academy of Art University, Honorary Doctorate, San Francisco, California, 2003
Masters Series Award, School of Visual Arts, New York City, New York, 2008
Art Center College of Design, Los Angeles, California, 2012
Honorary Member Award for Lifetime Achievement Award, Society of Typographic Arts, Chicago, Illinois, 2018

 Notable works and accomplishments 
 Belmont Beach Aquatic Center, Environmental Graphics, Signage and Color Palette for 5-acre aquatic sports community recreation center with RoTo Architects, Long Beach, California, in progress India Institute of Technology, Experimental Typography, Keynote Speech, Industrial Design Centre, Mumbai, India, March 2, 2019 – March 4, 2019
Architecture + Design Museum (A+D), Farbe/Color: Armin Hofmann, Exhibition Design and Curation with RoTo Architects, 2013, traveled to Miller Institute for Contemporary Art, Carnegie Mellon University, Pittsburgh, Pennsylvania, November 15, 201 – March 1, 2015; Rosenwald-Wolf Gallery, Philadelphia, Pennsylvania, August 24 – October 7, 2016; and Minneapolis College of Art and Design (MCAD) Gallery, Minneapolis, Minnesota, July 28 – September 17, 2017.
Apple Documentary Movie, MAC @ 30, Featured Designer, January 2014 
Architecture + Design Museum (A+D), Drylands Design, Exhibition Environmental Graphics and Graphic Design with Laurie Haycock Makela, Office of Hadley and Peter Arnold and Chu-Gooding Architects, Los Angeles, California, 2012
Victoria and Albert Museum (V&A), Postmodernism: Style and Subversion, 1970–1990, Exhibition and Publication with Essay, September 24, 2011–  January 15, 2012
Public Broadcasting Service (PBS), American Masters: The Architect and the Painter, Charles and Ray Eames, Video Contribution to Film, 2011
Pacoima Neighborhood City Hall, Environmental Graphics, Signage and Color Palette for Architecture with RoTo Architects, Pacoima, California, 2010
Orange County Great Park, Environmental Graphics, Signage and Color Palette for 1400-acre Park with Ken Smith Landscape Architect, Irvine, California, 2008
Madame Tussaud’s Wax Museum, Color and Materials Palette for Architecture with RoTo Architects, Hollywood, California, 2008
Urban Partners, Hand Holding a Bowl of Rice, Public Art Commission for Wilshire Vermont Metro Station, Los Angeles, California, 2007
Art Center College of Design, Honorary Doctorate, Los Angeles, California, 2012
Pasadena Museum of California Art, Drive-by Shooting: April Greiman Digital Photography, Solo Exhibition and Monograph Publication Design, Pasadena, California, September 9 – October 8, 2006
Prairie View School of Art and Architecture, Color and Materials Palette for Architecture with RoTo Architects, and Texas A & M University, Prairie View, Texas, 2005
Rotovision, Something From Nothing, Monograph Publication Design, 2001
Monacelli Press, From the Center: Design Process @ SCI-Arc,” 1998
Chrysler Award for Design Innovation, Auburn Hill, Michigan, 1998
Miracle Manor Retreat, Design Concept, Interactive and Environmental Graphics and Interiors for Architecture with RoTo Architects, Desert Hot Springs, California, 1997–2018
Rizzoli International Publications, Michele Saee: Buildings & Projects, Publication Design, 1997.
US Postal Commission, 19th Amendment to the U.S. Constitution, Commemorative Stamp, Washington, District of Columbia (DC), August 26, 1995
Warehouse C, Color Palette for Architecture with RoTo Architects, Nagasaki, Japan, 1995
Artemis Publishers, ItsnotwhatAprilyouthinkitGreimanis = cen'estpascequevouscroyez, Monograph Publication Design, 1994
Der Stiftung Buchkunst Prâmiert (Best Books of the World), for From the Edge, Student Workbook, Southern California Institute of Architecture (SCI-Arc), Frankfurt Book Fair Bronze Medal, 1994
Aldus Corporation Video Conference Program, Spokesperson with Paul Brainerd, New York City, New York; Chicago, Illinois; Seattle, Washington; and Toronto, Canada, 1993
Nicola Restaurant, Color and Materials Palette for Architecture as well as Custom Dinnerware, Billboards, Branding and Graphics with RoTo Architects, Los Angeles, California, 1993
Carlson-Reges Residence, Color and Materials Palette for Architecture with RoTo Architects, Los Angeles, California, 1992
Community Redevelopment Agency of Los Angeles (CRA/LA), Walk Earth Talk, Public Art Commission collaboration with Lucille Clifton, Citicorp Plaza Poet’s Walk, Los Angeles, California, 1991
Watson-Guptill Publishers, Hybrid Imagery: The Fusion of Technology and Graphic Design, Monograph Publication Design, 1990
Walker Art Center, Graphic Design in America: A Visual Language History, Exhibition, Poster and Billboard, Featured Designer, Minneapolis, Minnesota, 1989
National Endowment for the Arts (NEA), Computer Graphic Studies Grant, Washington, District of Columbia, 1987
Walker Art Center and MIT Press, Design Quarterly #133: ‘Does it Make Sense?’, Publication Design, 1986. 
Olympic Organizing Committee, Official Poster for the 1984 Olympic Games, Collaboration with Jayme Odgers, Los Angeles, California, 1984
WET Magazine, Magazine Cover, Collaboration with Jayme Odgers, 1976
Museum of Modern Art (MOMA), The Taxi Project, Exhibition and Catalogue Design with Emilio Ambasz, Curator, New York City, New York, 1975

 Collections 
Collections of the Cooper Hewitt Design Museum, Museum of Modern Art (MOMA), San Francisco Museum of Modern Art (SFMOMA), Los Angeles County Museum of Art (LACMA) and Centre Pompidou

 Monographs 

 April Greiman, WhiteSpace: April Greiman Photography, published by April Greiman, 2021
 April Greiman, Drive-by Shooting: April Greiman Digital Photography, exhibition catalog for Pasadena Museum of California Art, 2006
 April Greiman and Aris Janigian, Something From Nothing, Rotovision, 2001
 April Greiman and Liz Farelly, Floating Ideas into Time and Space, Watson-Guptill Publishers, Cutting Edge Series, 1998
 F. Fort, R Poynor and C. Kultenbrouwer, it'snotwhatyouthinkitis = cen'estpascequevouscroyez, Artemis Publishers, 1994
 April Greiman, Hybrid Imagery: The Fusion of Technology and Graphic Design, Watson-Guptill Publishers,1990

 Keynote speeches 

 April Greiman, Seeing is a way of thinking. Thinking, a way of seeing, Virginia Tech School of Architecture and Design, March 14, 2022
 Objects in Space, Alliance Graphique Internationale (AGI) Open Rotterdam, Rotterdam, The Netherlands, September 24, 2019
 Experimental Typography, India Institute of Technology, Industrial Design Centre, Mumbai, India, March 2, 2019 – March 4, 2019
 Color as Space, Space as Color, Bend Design Conference, Bend, Oregon, October 2, 2018
 Borders, Alliance Graphique Internationale (AGI) at La Maison du Radio, Paris, France, September 20, 2017
 Grand Masters of Design, Indian Institute of Technology, Industrial Design Centre, Mumbai, India, February 4, 2007 – February 9, 2007April Greiman, MAC Summit at University of California–Santa Barbara, Santa Barbara, California, 1995
 April Greiman, Too Corporation, MacWorld, Tokyo, Japan, 1992
 April Greiman, IDEAS ‘92 Student Symposium, Melbourne, Australia, 1992

 Professional societies and positions 

 Elected Member, The Trusteeship, International Women’s Forum, Newport Beach, California, 2010  
 Women in the Arts, Art Table, 2004
 Jury Chairperson, General Services Administration Design Awards, Washington, District of Columbia, 1999
 USA Expert Juror, China’s First International Graphic Arts Competition, Beijing, China, 1996
 USA Expert Juror, Expo 2000 Mascot Competition, Hannover, Germany, 1995
 USA Expert Juror, Netherlands All Design Disciplines Competition, Netherlands, 1995
 USA Expert Juror, City of Berlin Identity Program Competition, Berlin, Germany, 1993
 Chairperson, AIGA Communications Graphics Competition, New York City, New York, 1993
 Co-Chair with Tibor Kalman, What’s Going On Now, AIGA National Conference, San Francisco, California, 1987
Invited Member, Alliance Graphique Internationale (AGI), 1986–present
 National Board Member, AIGA, 1986–1988
 President and Vice-President, AIGA, Los Angeles, 1982–1988

 Solo exhibitions 
In 2006, the Pasadena Museum of California Art mounted a one-woman show of her digital photography entitled: Drive-by Shooting: April Greiman Digital Photography. She was also in the major group show at Centre Georges Pompidou in Paris called Elle@Centre Pompidou. In 2007, Greiman completed her largest ever work: a public mural, Hand Holding a Bowl of Rice, spanning "seven stories of two building facades marking the entrance to the Wilshire Vermont Metro Station in Los Angeles." In 2014, Greiman collaborated with the London based artist-run organization Auto Italia South East along with a group of artists including Metahaven, in an exhibition POLYMYTH x Miss Information. The exhibition program was included in the external listings for Frieze Art Fair.Do Not Trust Atoms: April Greiman, Avatars and New Photography, bulthaup Los Angeles ‘Kunsthalle b,’ Los Angeles, California, February 1, 2017 – May 15, 2017Objects in Space: April Greiman, Woodbury University Wedge Gallery, Burbank, California, March 4, 2014 – March 30, 2014New Works: April Greiman, Subvecta Motus Gallery, Glendale, California, November 2012 – January 2013Think About What You Think About: April Greiman, Yoon Design: Ddoong Gallery, Korea Society of Basic Design & Art, Seoul, Korea, December 10, 2012 – December 16, 2012
 The Masters Series: April Greiman, School of Visual Arts (SVA) Visual Arts Museum, New York City, New York, October 20, 2008 – December 13, 2008Objects in Space, Salve Regina University, Newport, Rhode Island, October 17, 2007 – November 11, 2007
 Drive-by Shooting: April Greiman Digital Photography, Pasadena Museum of California Art, Pasadena, California, September 9, 2006 – October 8, 2006  
 Objects in Space, Nova Ljubjlanska Banka, Llubljana, Slovenia, November 2004
 Something from Nothing, Modern Book Gallery, Westwood, California, 2001
 Objects in Space, Selby Gallery, Ringling School of Art and Design, Sarasota, Florida, October 25, 1999 – November 24, 1999
 It’snotwhatAprilyouthinkitGreimanis, Arc en Rêve Centre d’Architecture, Bordeaux, France, 1994.
 Computer Graphics: April Greiman, Itoya Gallery, Tokyo, Japan, 1994.
 April Greiman: Hybrid Imagery, The Israel Museum, Jerusalem, Israel, 1989One Woman Show, Turner Dailey Gallery, Los Angeles, California, 1989April Greiman, Reinhold–Brown Gallery, New York City, New York, 1986

 Selected group exhibitions Between the Lines, Typography in LACMA’s Collection, Los Angeles County Museum of Art, Los Angeles, California, May 19, 2019–ongoingWest of Modernism: California Graphic Design, 1975–1995, Los Angeles County Museum of Art, Los Angeles, California, September 30, 2018 – April 21, 2019California: Designing Freedom, Designmuseo, Helsinki, Finland, November 10, 2017 – March 4, 2018
 California: Designing Freedom, The Design Museum, London, England, May 24, 2017 – October 17, 2017
 Static, Castle Fitzjohns Gallery, New York City, New York, 2016–2017
 Typeface to Interface: Graphic Design from the Collection, San Francisco Museum of Modern Art, San Francisco, California, May 14, 2016 – October 23, 2016
 Physical: Sex and the Body in the 1980s, Los Angeles County Museum of Art, Los Angeles, California, March 20, 2016 – July 31, 2016
 Designing Modern Women 1890–1990, Museum of Modern Art, New York City, New York, October 5, 2013 – October 19, 2014 
 California’s Designing Women: 1896–1986, The Autry Museum, Los Angeles, California, August 10, 2012 – January 6, 2013
 elles@centrepompidou: Women Artists in the Collections of the National Modern Art Museum, Centre Pompidou, Paris, France, May 27, 2009 – February 21, 2011Graphic Design: Now in Production, Walker Art Center, Minneapolis, Minnesota, 2011
 Graphic Design in America: A Visual Language History, Design Museum of London, London, England, 1990
 Graphic Design in America: A Visual Language History, IBM Gallery of Science and Art, New York City, New York, 1989
 Design USA, United States Information Agency, Travelling Exhibition throughout the United Socialist Soviet Republic (USSR), 1989
 Graphic Design in America: A Visual Language History'', Walker Art Center, Minneapolis, Minnesota, 1989

Selected clients 
Art Papers, Atlanta, Georgia
CBRE, Los Angeles, California
Cerritos Center for the Performing Arts, Cerritos, California
Coop Himmelb(l)au Architects, Vienna, Austria
DMJM and AECOM, Los Angeles, California
Esprit, San Francisco, California
Fresh and Easy, Los Angeles, California
Harley Ellis Devereau, Los Angeles, California
Herman Miller, Los Angeles, California
Lifetime Television, New York City, New York
Los Angeles Public Library, Los Angeles, California
Museum of Applied Arts, Vienna, Austria
Knoll, Los Angeles, California and New York City, New York
Southern California Institute of Architecture (SCI-Arc), Los Angeles, California 
Time Warner, New York City, New York
Vitra, Basel, Switzerland
Woodbury University School of Architecture, Burbank, California

Posters 

Cal State Sacramento – Think About What You Think About, 2004
 Samitaur Constructs, 2002 
 Objects in Space, Selby Gallery, 1999 
 Objects in Space, AIGA/OC, 1999 
 The Havana Project, MAK Center, 1996 
 Harry Marks, Lifetime Achievement BDA, 1996 
 It's Not April What You Think It Is, Exhibition, Bordeaux, 1994 
 Pikes Peak Big Fishy, 1994 
 AIGA Communication Graphics, 1993 
 Sci-Arc Admissions, 1993 
 Pikes Peak Lithographing Co., 1992 
 UCLA Summer Sessions, 1991 
 Sci-Arc Summer Programs, 1991 
 Sci-Arc Making Thinking, 1990 
 Graphic Design in America, 1989 
 The Modern Poster, MOMA, 1988 
 Shaping the Future of Healthcare, 1987 
 Workspace 1987, 1987 
 Pacific Wave, Fortuny Museum, 1987 
 LAICA Fashion Show + Clothing Sale, 1986 
 Design Quarterly #133: Does it Make Sense, 1986 
 Snow White and the Seven Pixels, 1986 
 Sci-Arc, Changing Concepts of Space in Architecture and Art, 1986
 Hashi, 1985 
 AIGA, California Design 2, 1985 
 LA Olympic Games, 1984 
 Iris Light, 1984 
 Your Turn, My Turn, 3-D, 1983 
 CalArts, 1978 
 Peter Shire, Swissiyaki, 1978

See also
 List of AIGA medalists

References

External links
 MadeinSpace.la
 MadeinSpaceShop.net
 AprilGreiman.com
 Drive-by Shooting: April Greiman Digital Photography

AIGA medalists
American graphic designers
Women graphic designers
Artists from California
Artists from Missouri
1948 births
Living people
Kansas City Art Institute alumni
California Institute of the Arts faculty
Pentagram partners (past and present)
American women graphic designers